Maanja Velu is a 2010 Indian Tamil-language masala film directed by A. Venkatesh. It stars Arun, Karthik, Prabhu and Dhansika, with Vijayakumar and Riyaz Khan playing supporting roles and Santhanam and Ganja Karuppu providing comical relief.

It is a remake of the 2007 Telugu film Lakshyam. It has also been dubbed in Hindi as Zakhmi Cheetah. The film became a hit at the box office similar to the previous outing Malai Malai.

Plot
The film starts with a flashback. ACP Bose is a sincere police officer happily married. He lives with his parents and younger brother Velu. Velu is a college student, and he falls in love with his classmate Anjali. Enters Umapathi, the villain who is notorious for settlements and land deals. Anjali comes across Bose when she is on a field trip from her college with her friends. She gets friendly with his daughter Pinky, who tells her that she would get her introduced to her uncle Velu, and they would make a good pair. It turns out that Velu studies in Anjali's college and soon after, they come to know each other and get close.

Bose investigate the case of Umapathi, whom no one has been able to touch. He is even involved with a land deal involving crores of money which is completely illegal and others including the DIG is involved. When the chairman of the bank who has lent money for the deal demands the money back as the deal has not worked, Umapathi eliminates him. The people who are customers of the bank take to the streets and try to damage the bank. Bose arrives there, arrests the manager, and takes him away. Somehow, Umapathi discovers the manager's whereabouts. He arrives there with his men and the DIG and nearly kills Bose. Umapathi asks his men to dump the body. On the way, Velu gets involved and ultimately rescues Bose from a burning bus, and Bose dies in Velu's arms. The entire media and the people think Bose has swindled off all the money as they have been made to believe that by the DIG.

Velu decides to take revenge on the people who killed his brother. Firstly he kills Dinesh, his friend and Umapathi's henchman. Then he kills the DIG (he had been taken to jail and he had escaped). Umapathi also kidnaps Velu's entire family. Velu goes to an old temple where he kills Umapathi. He spills the beans that Bose is dead, and he rescues his family under the supervision of the new DIG Gautham Ganesh, who supports him wholeheartedly.

Cast

 Arun as Velu
 Karthik as ACP Subash Chandra Bose aka ACP Bose
 Prabhu as DIG Gautham Ganesh IPS
 Dhansika as Anjali
 Santhanam as Manickam
 Chandrashekar as Umapathi
 Hemanth as Dinesh
 Riyaz Khan as Easwara Pandian
 Ilavarasu as Sivagnanam
 Ganja Karuppu as Bhooshan
 Vijayakumar as Velu's father
 Meera Krishnan as Velu's mother
 Anu Haasan as Bose's wife
 Nizhalgal Ravi as Anjali's father
 Shakeela as Mathangi;Manikkam and Bhooshan's mother
 Lollu Sabha Manohar as Ezhumalai;Manikkam and Bhooshan's father
 R. S. Shivaji  as Avatar mama
 Thyagu
 Singamuthu as Guruji

Production
After the success of his film Malai Malai, Arun Vijay teams with Malai Malai team ( which consists of A Venkatesh, Mani Sharma, Santhanam and producer Mohan) for second time, Venkatesh decided to remake the Telugu film Lakshyam. The film was said to be titled as Maanja Madhan which proved untrue and it is changed as Maanja Velu.

Suresh Gopi was initially selected to play the role of Arun's elder brother but he was replaced by another senior actor Karthik who made his comeback through this film. Dhansika, who was one of the five girls in Peraanmai has been selected to play the pair opposite hero making her first project as a solo heroine.

First schedule of the film was started with song at Bangkok. The climax fight scenes of the film were canned in Ekkattuthangal Burma Colony Muneeswarar Temple, Chennai for the last 5 days and were shot using two outdoor units and four cameras. The set was built like that of a ruined temple, with a 50 ft tall 'Aiyanaar' statue erected at a whopping 65 lakhs. A scene featuring 400 junior artists and 25 stunt artists was canned in a festival set that was erected around the temple. A scene in which Arun Vijay kicking two fighters by jumping from a platform was being shot, for which both the fighters were tied on with a transparent nylon rope, to avoid accidents. One of the nylon ropes got unexpectedly tangled with Arun Vijay's right arm while he was performing the action. Arun Vijay's elbow was badly injured due to the accident and his whole arm swelling at once. The actor was immediately offered first aid by the stunt master Kanal Kannan and was rushed to the hospital where he was offered emergency treatment, for this scene Arun tonsured his head to give a new look and also hanged upside down which was shot for 7 days. Songs were shot at Pazhani, Dindigul and Chennai. The title song of the film was shot in Pondicherry schedule with 80 junior artists. Few stunts were shot at Trichy and Stunt master Kanal Kannan has given 45 days of his schedule.

Controversy
Before the release, Dr. Kalidoss has stated that he had been in the film industry for the past 15 years and that he completed a film titled ‘Thunichal’ with Arun Vijay in the lead in the year 2008. He also stated that though the Censor Board had cleared the film, Arun Vijay had ‘purposely’ delayed the release of the film by not completing his portion of the ‘dubbing’ work. As he had spent Rs.2 crores till date, the producer told Vijay that he couldn't continue to shoot the film. Meanwhile, he was asked by the actor to release Thunichal after his ‘Malai Malai’ released. Due to his non-cooperation, instead of releasing ‘Thunichal’ in 160 theatres, I could release the film only in 16 theatres on 1 January this year, said Kalidoss. Due to this, I incurred a loss of Rs.1.5 crores, he added. "Due to the mental harassment I had to endure because of Arun Vijay, I couldn’t continue my profession as a doctor for the past 4 years. Vijay has to pay me Rs.1.5 crores and till he does so, the release of his ‘Maanja Velu’ should be stayed till the 19th of this month," he had stated in the petition 
Dr. Mohan, producer of ‘Maanja Velu’ and father-in-law of Arun Vijay, had filed a counter petition with the Court praying for vacation of the stay on the grounds that he, as a producer, had nothing to do with Dr. Kalidoss’ case and requested that as such, his film should be allowed to release on the stipulated date. Advocate G. Murugesh Kumar, who appeared on behalf of Dr. Mohan in the court of Mr. Justice T. S. Sivagnanam, managed to putforth his point of view strongly before the Judge and said that Dr. Kalidoss had ‘wrongly informed’ the Court in the matter. As soon as the Judge announced that he'd be giving the verdict based on the ‘actual nature’ of the case, Dr. Kalidoss is said to have ‘withdrawn’ his petition from the Court. Following this, the Judge dismissed the petition and said that the film could release on 21 May as per its original schedule.

Music

The soundtrack is composed by Mani Sharma and he reused the tunes from the original film Lakshyam. Audio function was attended by Producers Council chief Rama Narayanan, secretary Sivasakthi pandian, director Shakthi Chidambaram, actors Karthik, Shaam, Jai, Sibiraj, Sundar C.

Critical response
The soundtrack was released to generally positive reviews. Behindwoods said, "there is nothing in the album that will make it stand up for itself". Milliblog said, "getting 3 decent tracks in a masala potboiler soundtrack is a huge win indeed". Indiaglitz said, "Over all, the music of Maanja Velu will definitely be chart busters and the music will have a wide reach. Mani Sharma, has used the tunes of his hit songs in Telugu in this album, which would surely appeal even to the Tamil audience".

Release
The satellite rights of the film were sold to Kalaignar. The film was given an "A" certificate by the Indian Censor Board and released on 21 May 2010 alongside Magane En Marumagane, Kanagavel Kaaka, Kutti Pisasu, Kola Kolaya Mundhirika and Kutrapirivu.

Reception

Box office
The film has seen an above average opening with total collections running up to Rs.18 lakhs and weekend collections at Rs.3,38,177 in second week. After that, weekend saw Rs. 4,22,307 drawn in its favor with Rs. 26 lakhs over the last weeks. Rs. 1,76,967 was made by the film this weekend with Rs.32 lakhs spanning over 3 weeks. Total collections in Chennai was Rs. 26 lakhs. Overall trade pundits declared the film as "decent hit" due to the medium budget it was produced on.

Critical response
Sify said, "On the whole director Venkatesh has dished out an average run of the mill mass masala cocktail which is quite entertaining in the first half but fizzles out in the second half with a predictable long drawn out climax". Behindwoods said, "Maanja Velu is an entertainer that aims to satisfy all types of audiences and A. Venkatesh has managed to create a screenplay that takes care of all requirements. But, there is a feeling that the full potential of the script has not been realized. It is still a decent entertainer which can be watched especially for its wonderful casting". Times of India said, "The one thing that strikes you about Maanja Velu is what a talent house Tamil cinema has been. As you watch the parade of the seniors like Karthik, Prabhu, Vijaykumar and Vagai Chandrasekhar you feel glad that they came up with good, great, moving or simply lovable performances in the past. It does a lot to ease the heart burn caused by the so-called earthy cinema that we have been treated to for months and months now. Where you saw plenty of victims of circumstances on display, but so very lacking in angst that you came away from the movie without any emotional connect". Indiaglitz said, "A perfect one for those who love masala flicks". Chennaionline said, "Maanja Velu has all the ingredients of a masala flick but the problem is that it has no novelty or neatness to impress us". Top 10 cinema said, "The movie may have its reach amongst the commercial film lovers, who have no regards for logics".

References

External links
 

2010 films
Tamil remakes of Telugu films
Films shot in Tiruchirappalli
Films shot in Chennai
Films shot in Bangkok
2010s Tamil-language films
Films scored by Mani Sharma
Indian action films
2010 masala films
Films set in Tiruchirappalli
Fictional portrayals of the Tamil Nadu Police
Indian nonlinear narrative films
Films directed by A. Venkatesh (director)
2010 action films